William Joshua Doss Richerson (died 1976) was an athlete, with skills in shot put, discus, javelin, and football. He played for the American Football League, on the Chicago Bulls football team in the 1926 year.

He was married to Kansas City, Missouri artist Modesta Pearl Dorset Richerson. Together, they had two children, Billy Doss Richerson and Vallie Jean Richerson Medlin.

Richerson's mother wrote a biography of the Richardson family of Texas, noting that she was born a Richardson, but had married into the Richerson family. In her book, she talks in length about her son's sports abilities in high school and college.

In 1976, Doss Richerson died of a blood clot to the brain after sustaining a head injury from a three story fall from a building that he was painting.

References

Players of American football from Texas
Chicago Bulls (American football) players
Year of birth missing
1976 deaths